Odette Herviaux (born 6 January 1948) is a French political personality. Member of the Socialist Party, she was the Mayor of La Croix-Helléan (Morbihan department) and Regional Councillor of Brittany. She served as a Senator from Morbihan between 2001 and 2017.

Biography

References
Page on the Senate website

1948 births
Living people
Socialist Party (France) politicians
French Senators of the Fifth Republic
Women members of the Senate (France)
Senators of Morbihan